Y Êli Niê (born 8 January 2001) is a Vietnamese footballer who plays as a goalkeeper for V.League 1 club Hoàng Anh Gia Lai and the Vietnam national under-23 team.

Early life 
Y Êli Niê was born as the fifth child of seven. He is part of the rade ethnic group, who assign surnames matrilineally (contrary to Vietnamese convention).

He started playing football aged 10. He won the National U11 Championship with the Dak Lak U11 team.

Honours
Vietnam U23
 AFF U-23 Championship: 2022

References

External links
 
 Y Eli Niê at vpf.vn

2001 births
Living people
Rade people
People from Đắk Lắk Province
Vietnamese footballers
Association football goalkeepers
Dak Lak FC players
Hoang Anh Gia Lai FC players

Vietnam youth international footballers